Constantinesco may refer to:

 Constantinesco (automobile)
 Constantinescu, people with the surname Constantinesco or Constantinescu